The following is a list of notable deaths in October 2016.

Entries for each day are listed alphabetically by surname. A typical entry lists information in the following sequence:
Name, age, country of citizenship and reason for notability, established cause of death, reference.

October 2016

1
Edda Heiðrún Backman, 58, Icelandic actress (101 Reykjavík), motor neurone disease.
Brian Bell, 86, New Zealand ornithologist.
Bobby Burnett, 73, American football player (Buffalo Bills), pancreatic cancer.
William Dumbrell, 90, Australian biblical scholar.
David Herd, 82, Scottish footballer (Arsenal, Manchester United, national team).
Anton Jeyanathan, 68, Sri Lankan politician, traffic collision.
Jagoda Kaloper, 69, Croatian actress (W.R.: Mysteries of the Organism).
Erol Keskin, 89, Turkish footballer (Fenerbahçe, Adaletspor, national team).
Daphne Odjig, 97, Canadian First Nations artist.
Vittorio Scantamburlo, 86, Italian football manager and scout.
Roger Theder, 77, American football player and coach, Parkinson's disease.
Lowell Thomas Jr., 92, English-born American film producer and politician, member of the Alaska Senate (1967–1974), Lieutenant Governor of Alaska (1974–1978).
Toni Williams, 77, Cook Islands-born New Zealand singer.

2
David Abdulai, 65, Ghanaian physician.
Georg Apenes, 76, Norwegian politician and jurist.
Walter Darby Bannard, 82, American painter.
Betty Blayton-Taylor, 79, American artist, arts administrator, and co-founder of the Studio Museum in Harlem.
Steve Byrd, 61, English guitarist (Gillan, Kim Wilde), heart attack.
Gordon Davidson, 83, American stage and film director.
Pierre Durand Sr., 84, French Olympic equestrian.
Mary Hesse, 91, British academician and educator.
Ed McHugh, 86, American Olympic soccer player.
Sir Neville Marriner, 92, British conductor (Amadeus), founder of the Academy of St Martin in the Fields.
Bobby Molloy, 80, Irish politician, TD (1965–2002).
Jeroen Oerlemans, 46, Dutch photojournalist, shot.
Gary Reed, 60, American comic book writer (Deadworld, Baker Street), heart attack.
Thomas Round, 100, British opera singer.
Hanna Zora, 77, Iraqi-born Iranian-Canadian Chaldean Catholic hierarch, Archbishop of Ahwaz (1974–2011) and Mar Addai of Toronto (2011–2014).

3
Cai Qirui, 102, Chinese chemist, educator and academician (Chinese Academy of Sciences).
Alain Chevallier, 68, French motorcycle designer, cancer.
Ljupka Dimitrovska, 70, Macedonian-born Croatian singer.
Isobel Finnerty, 86, Canadian politician, Senator (1999–2005).
Anthony Goodman, 80, British medieval historian.
K. David van Hoesen, 90, American bassoonist.
Ahmad Salama Mabruk, 59, Egyptian leader of Jabhat al-Nusra, drone strike.
Andrew Vicari, 84, British painter.
Mário Wilson, 86, Portuguese football player and manager (Sporting, Académica, Benfica).

4
Gair Allie, 84, American baseball player (Pittsburgh Pirates), heart disease.
Mario Almada, 94, Mexican actor (La Viuda Negra).
Kenneth Angell, 86, American Roman Catholic prelate, Bishop of Burlington (1992–2005).
Yusuf Arakkal, 70, Indian painter.
Bertrand M. Bell, 86, American physician, key figure in the Libby Zion Law legislation, kidney failure.
Terry Butler, 58, Australian rugby league player, lung cancer.
Elaine Lustig Cohen, 89, American graphic designer.
Caroline Crawley, 53, British singer and musician (Shelleyan Orphan, This Mortal Coil).
Stephen de Mowbray, 91, British counterintelligence officer.
Melvin M. Grumbach, 90, American pediatrician.
Brigitte Hamann, 76, German-Austrian historian and author.
Pieter Hintjens, 53, Belgian software developer, euthanasia.
Merfyn Jones, 85, Welsh footballer (Scunthorpe United, Crewe Alexandra, Chester City).
Hso Khan Pha, 78, Burmese-born Canadian geologist and exiled prince of Yawnghwe.
Ivan C. Lafayette, 86, American soldier, civic activist and politician.
Fred Osam-Duodu, 78, Ghanaian football manager.
Jim Parrott, 74, Canadian politician, MLA for Fundy-River Valley (2010–2014).
Doug Slaten, 36, American baseball player.
Bing Thom, 75, Hong Kong-born Canadian architect, brain aneurysm.
Harsh Vardhan, 68, Indian politician.
Donald H. White, 95, American composer.

5
Girma Asmerom, 66, Eritrean politician.
Georges Balandier, 95, French sociologist, anthropologist and ethnologist.
Jarlath Carey, 74, Irish Gaelic football player.
Pompeiu Hărășteanu, 81, Romanian opera singer.
Dick Haugland, 73, American biochemist, brain cancer.
Michal Kováč, 86, Slovak politician, President (1993–1998), complications of Parkinson's disease.
György Márkus, 82, Hungarian philosopher.
Luisa Massimo, 87, Italian pediatrician.
Yasmin Modassir, Indian zoologist.
Conxita Mora Jordana, 61, Andorran politician and businesswoman, Mayor of Andorra la Vella (1999-2003) and MP (2009-2011).
Cameron Moore, 25, American basketball player (Reyer Venezia Mestre).
Arthur Z'ahidi Ngoma, 69, Congolese politician, vice-president of the transitional government (2003–2007).
Donald M. Phillips, 87, Canadian politician, MLA for South Peace River.
Josh Samman, 28, American mixed martial artist (UFC).
Michiyo Yasuda, 77, Japanese animator (Spirited Away, Grave of the Fireflies, Princess Mononoke).
Brock Yates, 82, American automotive journalist (Car and Driver) and screenwriter (Smokey and the Bandit II, The Cannonball Run), Alzheimer's disease.

6
Hans W. Becherer, 81, American businessman, president of John Deere (1987).
James Colaianni, 94, American lay theologian.
Peter Denton, 70, English footballer (Coventry, Luton).
Walter Greiner, 80, German theoretical physicist.
Hidipo Hamutenya, 77, Namibian politician, Foreign Minister (2002–2004).
Alan Hodgson, 64, English cricketer (Northamptonshire).
Heisnam Kanhailal, 75, Indian art theatre personality.
Eva Lokko, Ghanaian engineer and politician.
Tony Mottram, 96, British tennis player.
Barbara Oliver Hagerman, 73, Canadian music teacher and public servant, Lieutenant Governor of Prince Edward Island (2006–2011), cancer.
George Pernicano, 98, American businessman, co-owner of the San Diego Chargers.
Marina Sanaya, 57, Russian Olympic figure skater (1972).
Fred Slaughter, 74, American college basketball player (UCLA).
Nello Sforacchi, 94, Italian cyclist 
Mike Tomkies, 88, British nature writer.

7
John Gleeson, 78, Australian Test cricketer.
Ross Higgins, 85, Australian actor (Kingswood Country, Bullpitt!).
Lyudmila Ivanova, 83, Russian actress (Office Romance).
Barbara Kisseler, 67, German culture manager and politician.
Frederick C. Neidhardt, 85, American microbiologist.
Anne Pashley, 80, British athlete and opera singer, Olympic silver medalist (1956).
Gonzalo Peralta, 36, Argentine footballer (Almirante Brown, Platense), cancer.
Martha Roth, 84, Italian-born Mexican actress (A Family Like Many Others).
Wolfgang Suschitzky, 104, Austro-Hungarian-born British photographer and cinematographer (Get Carter).
Alistair Urquhart, 97, Scottish author and soldier (Gordon Highlanders).
Bill Warren, 73, American film historian and critic.
Rebecca Wilson, 54, Australian sports journalist, breast cancer.

8
Peter Allen, 96, American radio broadcaster, host of Metropolitan Opera radio broadcasts (1975–2004).
Helmut Anschütz, 84, German Olympic fencer (1960).
Guillaume Bieganski, 83, French footballer (Lens).
Stephen Bollenbach, 74, American businessman, CEO of Hilton (1996–2007).
Lyn Chevli, 84, American underground comics artist (Tits & Clits Comix).
Don Ciccone, 70, American singer-songwriter and musician (The Critters, The Four Seasons, Tommy James and the Shondells).
Ray William Clough, 96, American engineer.
Gary Dubin, 57, American actor (The Partridge Family, The Aristocats, Jaws 2), bone cancer.
Maximiliano Giusti, 25, Argentine footballer, traffic collision.
Alina María Hernández, 46, Cuban-American transsexual actress.
Mayer Hersh, 90, Polish survivor of Auschwitz.
Dickie Jeeps, 84, English rugby union player (Northampton Saints) and administrator (Sports Council).
Klaus Kertess, 76, American curator, art gallerist and writer, complications from Alzheimer's.
Kuo Chin-fa, 72, Taiwanese Hokkien pop singer, cardiorespiratory failure.
Wojciech Kurpiewski, 50, Polish sprint canoer, Olympic silver medalist (1992).
Luc Mbassi, 58/59, Cameroonian Olympic footballer (1984).
Michael Horace Miller, 88, British Royal Air Force officer.
Jacob Neusner, 84, American academician and Judaica scholar.
Stylianos Pattakos, 103, Greek military officer and coup leader, Deputy Prime Minister (1967–1973).
Giovanni Scognamillo, 87, Turkish film critic.
Pierre Tchernia, 88, French screenwriter and voice actor (Asterix).
Anton Winkler, 62, German luger, Olympic bronze medalist (1980).

9
Susan Aceron, 44, Canadian actress, voice actress and businesswoman (Sailor Moon, Beyblade, The In-Laws), nasopharynx cancer.
René Avilés Fabila, 75, Mexican author, heart attack.
Worth H. Bagley, 92, American admiral.
Bored Nothing, 26, Australian musician, suicide.
Mamadou Dembelé, 82, Malian physician and politician, Prime Minister (1986–1988).
Santo DiPietro, 81, American businessman and politician, member of the Maine House of Representatives (1989–1996) and mayor of South Portland, Maine (1986–1987).
Francis Duteil, 69, French Olympic cyclist.
Donn Fendler, 90, American wilderness survivor.
Sir Anthony Grant, 91, British politician, MP (1964–1997).
David Konstant, 86, English Roman Catholic prelate, Bishop of Leeds (1985–2004).
El Mongol, 86, Mexican professional wrestler (GCW).
Zara Nutley, 90, New Zealand-born British actress.
Aaron Pryor, 60, American light-welterweight boxer, WBA/IBF world champion (1980–1985), heart disease.
Bilge Tarhan, 75, Turkish Olympic footballer.
Kenneth P. Thompson, 50, American lawyer, Kings County District Attorney (since 2014), cancer.
Andrzej Wajda, 90, Polish film director (Ashes and Diamonds, Man of Iron, Katyń), pulmonary failure.

10
Tony Adamowicz, 75, American racing driver (IMSA GT, Trans Am Series), brain cancer.
Issa Bagayogo, 54, Malian musician.
Leo Beranek, 102, American acoustics expert (BBN Technologies).
Christian Erlandsen, 90, Norwegian politician, MP (1977–1985).
Lorenzo Freeman, 52, American football player (Pittsburgh Steelers, New York Giants).
Parmeshwar Godrej, 70, Indian socialite, businesswoman, and AIDS activist.
Gerry Gow, 64, Scottish footballer (Bristol City, Manchester City, Rotherham), cancer.
Graham C. Greene, 80, British publisher (Jonathan Cape).
Tamme Hanken, 56, German television personality (Der XXL-Ostfriese).
Marnix Kappers, 73, Dutch actor, suicide.
Hans Petter Langtangen, 54, Norwegian computer scientist.
Drew Nelson, 60, Northern Irish solicitor, politician, and Grand Secretary of the Grand Orange Lodge of Ireland.
Eddie O'Hara, 80, Scottish footballer (Falkirk, Everton, Barnsley).
Maulwi Saelan, 88, Indonesian Olympic footballer (1956).
Ram Ekbal Singh Warsi, 94, Indian politician, MLA (1969–1972).
Kazunari Tanaka, 49, Japanese voice actor (Gundam, Planetes, InuYasha), intracerebral hemorrhage.
John Vaughn, 88, American religious leader, Minister General of the Order of Friars Minor (1979–1991).
Gonzalo Vega, 69, Mexican actor (Life Is Most Important, The Place Without Limits).

11
David Antin, 84, American poet and performance artist.
Tom Barnes, 70, American journalist (Pittsburgh Post-Gazette).
Patricia Barry, 93, American actress (All My Children, The Guiding Light, Days of Our Lives).
Ricky Callan, 54, Scottish actor.
Emerson Stephen Colaw, 94, American theologian and prelate, Bishop of the United Methodist Church.
Richard Fry, 92, British WWII army officer. 
Matti Hagman, 61, Finnish ice hockey player (Boston Bruins, Edmonton Oilers, HIFK).
Pia Hallström, 55, Swedish politician, MP for Värmland (since 2010), breast cancer.
Lars Huldén, 90, Finnish writer and translator.
Dick Israel, 68, Filipino actor, complications from a stroke.
Steve Lemmens, 44, Belgian snooker player, suicide.
Antero Lumme, 82, Finnish racing cyclist.
Marju, 28, Irish Thoroughbred racehorse. (death announced on this date)
Jan Matocha, 93, Czechoslovak Olympic sprint canoer (1948, 1952).
Peter Reynolds, 58, Welsh composer.
Don Ringe, 70, American journalist and documentary filmmaker.
Pero Simić, 70, Bosnian Serb journalist and historian.
Teatao Teannaki, 80, I-Kiribati politician, Vice-President (1979–1991) and President (1991–1994), heart attack.
Gurcharan Virk, 48, Indian Punjabi writer, director, lyricist and producer, heart attack.
Ewen Whitaker, 94, British astronomer.

12
Reinhart Ahlrichs, 76, German theoretical chemist.
Des Ball, 69, Australian security and defence expert, cancer.
Shahlyla Baloch, 20, Pakistani footballer (national team), traffic collision.
Robert Bateman, 80, American songwriter and record producer ("Please Mr. Postman"), heart attack.
Beata Bergström, 95, Swedish photographer.
Pietro Diana, 84, Italian artist.
Frank Fischl, 89, American air force pilot and politician, Mayor of Allentown, Pennsylvania (1978–1982).
Thomas Mikal Ford, 52, American actor (Martin, Harlem Nights, Across the Tracks) and comedian, stomach aneurysm.
Jack Greenberg, 91, American lawyer and civil rights activist.
Rick Gudex, 48, American politician, member of the Wisconsin Senate (since 2013), suicide by gunshot.
Leo Harrison, 94, English cricketer (Hampshire).
Ma Jiang Bao, 74, Chinese martial arts teacher.
Renato Ongari, 81, Italian Olympic sprint canoeist (1960).
Bryan Pearson, 82, British-born Canadian politician.
Dylan Rieder, 28, American skateboarder and model, leukemia.
Sonny Sanders, 77, American songwriter, arranger and record producer.
Kemal Unakıtan, 70, Turkish politician, Minister of Finance (2002–2009).
Fulton Walker, 58, American football player (Miami Dolphins, Los Angeles Raiders).
Gerhard Wimberger, 93, Austrian composer.

13
Bhumibol Adulyadej, 88, Thai monarch, King (since 1946), world's longest-serving head of state.
William Gilbert Chaloner, 87, British palaeobotanist.
Delia Davin, 72, English pioneer of Chinese women's studies, cancer.
Curt Engelhorn, 90, German billionaire businessman.
Dario Fo, 90, Italian playwright, Nobel Literature Prize laureate (1997).
Robert Haszeldine, 91, British chemist.
Andrzej Kopiczyński, 82, Polish actor (Czterdziestolatek).
Richard A. Pittman, 71, American marine, recipient of the Medal of Honor.
Booneua Prasertsuwan, 97, Thai politician, Speaker of the House of Representatives (1995–1996).
Jim Prentice, 60, Canadian politician, Premier of Alberta (2014–2015), MP for Calgary Centre-North (2004–2010), plane crash.
Primo Sentimenti, 89, Italian footballer (Lazio, Parma).
Louis Stettner, 93, American photographer.
Tonino Valerii, 82, Italian film director (My Name Is Nobody, A Girl Called Jules, Sahara Cross).

14
Jean Alexander, 90, English actress (Coronation Street, Last of the Summer Wine).
Cirilo R. Almario, 85, Filipino Roman Catholic prelate, Bishop of Malolos (1977–1996).
Lucy Baxley, 78, American politician, Lieutenant Governor of Alabama (2003–2007).
Klim Churyumov, 79, Soviet and Ukrainian astronomer, co-discoverer of the comet 67P/Churyumov–Gerasimenko.
Brajbir Saran Das, 90, Indian politician, Chief administrative officer of Sikkim (1973-1974).
Kathryn Adams Doty, 96, American actress (Saboteur).
Pierre Étaix, 87, French clown, comedian and film director (Heureux Anniversaire, Yo Yo, Le Grand Amour), Oscar winner (1963), complications from intestinal infection.
Edward Gorman, 74, American writer, multiple myeloma.
Kamal Habibollahi, 86, Iranian politician and admiral. 
Avis Higgs, 98, New Zealand artist.
Thom Jones, 71, American writer.
Helen Kelly, 52, New Zealand trade unionist, lung cancer.
Brigit Pegeen Kelly, 65, American poet.
Werner Lämmerhirt, 67, German singer-songwriter and guitarist.
John Mone, 87, Scottish Roman Catholic prelate, Bishop of Paisley (1988–2004).
Farouk Shousha, 80, Egyptian poet.
Song Yeong, 76, South Korean writer.
Aleksandr Syomin, 73, Soviet Azerbaijani footballer (Neftçi).

15
Doug Anderson, 89, New Zealand rugby league player (Auckland, national team).
Marcel Berger, 89, French mathematician.
Hans Bruggeman, 89, Dutch activist and politician, member of the House of Representatives (1963–1967).
Dennis Byrd, 50, American football player (New York Jets), traffic collision.
Colin George, 87, Welsh actor (Coronation Street) and director.
Quentin Groves, 32, American football player (Jacksonville Jaguars, Oakland Raiders, Cleveland Browns), heart attack.
Teodor Laço, 80, Albanian politician, diplomat and author.
Jossy Mansur, 82, Aruban editor.
Bruce Marshall, 54, American ice hockey coach (Connecticut Huskies, Franklin Pierce Ravens).
Octagonal, 24, New Zealand-bred Australian Thoroughbred racehorse, euthanized.
Frank Peers, 98, Canadian broadcaster and political scientist. (death announced on this date)
Yangthang Rinpoche, 86, Indian Buddhist teacher.
Barbara Romack, 83, American golfer.
John Spanswick, 83, English cricketer (Kent).
Haruo Tomiyama, 81, Japanese photographer.
Per Rune Wølner, 67, Norwegian footballer (Strømsgodset), cancer.

16
Mickey Byrne, 93, Irish hurler (Tipperary).
Maggie Diaz, 91, American-born Australian photographer. 
Anthony Foley, 42, Irish rugby union player and coach (Munster), acute pulmonary oedema.
Tony Golab, 97, Canadian football player (Ottawa Rough Riders).
Calvin Gotlieb, 95, Canadian professor and computer scientist.
Cecilia Hart, 68, American television and stage actress (Paris), ovarian cancer.
*Valerie Hunter Gordon, 94, British inventor of disposable nappies.
Jia Jia, 38, Chinese giant panda, euthanized.
Kigeli V, 80, Rwandan monarch, King (1959–1961).
Ted V. Mikels, 87, American filmmaker (Girl in Gold Boots, The Astro-Zombies, The Doll Squad), colon cancer.
Stephen Moorbath, 87, German-born British geologist.
Arsen Pavlov, 33, Russian military officer, participant in the War in Donbass, IED explosion.
George Peebles, 80, Scottish footballer (Dunfermline, Stirling Albion).
Lucia Perillo, 58, American poet and novelist.
Juras Požela, 34, Lithuanian politician, Minister of Health (since March 2016), pancreatitis.
Juan Radrigán, 79, Chilean writer, cancer.
Molly Rose, 95, British World War II aviator.
Alfred P. Smyth, 74, Irish historian. 
Joseph A. Suozzi, 95, Italian-born American judge and politician.
 Geoffrey Yeh, 85, Hong Kong businessman. 
Viktor Zubkov, 79, Russian basketball player, Olympic silver medalist (1956, 1960).

17
Rufin Anthony, 76, Pakistani Roman Catholic prelate, Bishop of Islamabad-Rawalpindi (since 2010).
Eddie Applegate, 81, American actor (The Patty Duke Show, Easy A, A Ticklish Affair).
Sandra Bartky, 81, American feminist philosopher.
Vincenzino Culicchia, 84, Italian politician.
Laurie Dwyer, 77, Australian football player (North Melbourne).
Teodor Kufel, 96, Polish general.
Rolf Lamers, 89, German Olympic athlete.
Cephas Msipa, 85, Zimbabwean politician.
Edgar Munhall, 83, American art historian, pancreatic and lung cancer.
Elena Santonja, 84, Spanish television presenter.
Irwin Smigel, 92, American dentist, pneumonia.
Charles J. Stewart, 93, American actor.
Morris Stroud, 70, American football player (Kansas City Chiefs), Super Bowl winner (1970).
Rémy Vogel, 55, French footballer (Strasbourg).

18
Anthony Addabbo, 56, American actor (Guiding Light, Generations, The Bold & the Beautiful).
David Bunnell, 69, American businessman, writer and publisher (PC Magazine).
Phil Chess, 95, Polish-born American record producer and company executive (Chess Records).
Dave Colclough, 52, Welsh professional poker player, cancer.
Alan Collins, 88, English sculptor.
Anne Crookshank, 89, Irish art historian. 
Mike Daniels, 88, British jazz trumpeter and bandleader.
Marianne de Trey, 102, British potter.
Bobby Ellis, 84, Jamaican trumpeter, pneumonia-related illness.
Francis Flood, 86, Irish racehorse trainer.
Huw Jones, 82, Welsh Anglican bishop.
Sergei Likhachev, 76, Azeri-born Russian tennis player and coach.
William McKelvey, 82, British politician, MP for Kilmarnock and Loudoun (1983–1997).
Fred Roots, 93, Canadian geologist.
Gary Sprake, 71, Welsh footballer (Leeds United, national team).
Sir Sigmund Sternberg, 95, Hungarian-born British philanthropist, businessman and Labour Party donor.
Turki bin Saud al-Kabir, Saudi prince and convicted murderer, executed by beheading.
Ken Wiwa, 47, Nigerian journalist and author, stroke.

19
Tommy Bartlett, 88, American tennis and basketball coach.
Safet Berisha, 66, Albanian footballer (Partizani Tirana).
Mark Birch, 67, British jockey.
Radu Câmpeanu, 94, Romanian politician, Senator (1990–1992, 2004–2008).
Milka Canić, 72, Serbian television presenter and academic.
Yvette Chauviré, 99, French prima ballerina.
Luis María Echeberría, 76, Spanish footballer (Athletic Bilbao, national team).
Joe Kirrene, 85, American baseball player (Chicago White Sox).
Fergus O'Brien, 86, Irish politician, TD (1973–1992), Lord Mayor of Dublin (1980–1981).
Rough Quest, 30, British racehorse, winner of the 1996 Grand National, euthanised.
Pat Scott, 87, American baseball player (AAGPBL).
Mary Sheriff, 66, American art historian.
Norman Sherry, 91, British author.
Sammy Smyth, 91, Northern Irish footballer (Wolverhampton Wanderers F.C.).
Giovanni Steffè, 88, Italian Olympic rower.

20
Achieng Abura, 50s, Kenyan musician.
Edward A. Allworth, 95, American historian.
Henry J. M. Barnett, 94, Canadian physician.
David Bellini, 43, Italian screenwriter (Un medico in famiglia), lymphoma.
Bob Blauner, 87, American sociologist.
William G. Bowen, 83, American educator, President of Princeton University (1972–1988).
Kenneth Brandt, 77, American politician, member of the Pennsylvania House of Representatives (1973-1990).
Gail Cogdill, 79, American football player (Detroit Lions).
Roy D'Andrade, 84, American psychological anthropologist.
Uwe Dreher, 56, German footballer (Stuttgarter Kickers).
Seiji Hirao, 53, Japanese rugby union player and coach, bile duct cancer.
Kaneta Kimotsuki, 80, Japanese voice actor (Doraemon, Anpanman), pneumonia.
Roger Lallemand, 84, Belgian lawyer and politician, President of the Senate (1988).
Eric Harold Mansfield, 93, British aeronautical engineer.
Michael Massee, 64, American actor (The Crow, 24, The Amazing Spider-Man), stomach cancer.
Issifou Okoulou-Kantchati, 65, Togolese politician.
Giorgos Pavlidis, 60, Greek politician, Governor of Eastern Macedonia and Thrace (since 2014), cancer.
Svetlana Penkina, 65, Belarusian actress.
Benedict Read, 71, British art historian.
Simone Schaller, 104, American hurdler.
Stanley Silverstein, 91, American footwear manufacturer.
Junko Tabei, 77, Japanese mountaineer, first woman to climb Mount Everest, peritoneal cancer.
Mieke Telkamp, 82, Dutch singer.
Robert Weber, 92, American cartoonist.

21
Wally Argus, 95, New Zealand rugby union player (Canterbury, national team).
Paweł Baumann, 33, Polish Olympic sprint canoer (2004, 2008), world championship silver medalist (2006, 2007).
Margaret Benyon, 76, British hologram artist.
Dave Cash, 74, British radio presenter.
Richard Cavendish, 86, British occult writer.
Mary Keating Croce, 87, American politician.
Ted Follows, 89, Canadian actor.
Constantin Frățilă, 74, Romanian footballer (FC Dinamo București).
Frans Jozef van der Heijden, 78, Dutch politician, member of the House of Representatives (1982–1998), euthanasia.
Roy Jennings, 84, English footballer (Brighton and Hove Albion).
Dan Johnston, 77, American lawyer and politician.
Satyadev Katare, 61, Indian politician.
George Konik, 79, Canadian ice hockey player (Minnesota Fighting Saints, Pittsburgh Penguins).
Kenji Kosaka, 70, Japanese politician, Minister of Education (2005–2006).
Manfred Krug, 79, German actor (Tatort, Liebling Kreuzberg), singer, and author.
Frenchy Martin, 69, Canadian professional wrestler and manager (WWF), bladder cancer.
Bob McCord, 82, Canadian ice hockey player (Boston Bruins, Detroit Red Wings).
Kevin Meaney, 60, American comedian and actor (Big, Uncle Buck, Mad Jack the Pirate), heart attack.
Clément Michu, 79, French actor (Commissaire Moulin, Thierry la Fronde).
Paolo Micolini, 77, Italian politician.
Moscow Flyer, 22, Irish racehorse, colic. (death announced on this date)
Richard Nicoll, 39, British-Australian fashion designer, heart attack.
Janet Patterson, 60, Australian costume designer (The Piano, Peter Pan, Bright Star).
David Pope, 54, American basketball player (Kansas City Kings, Seattle SuperSonics).
Jerry Rullo, 93, American basketball player (Philadelphia Warriors, Baltimore Bullets).
Raine Spencer, Countess Spencer, 87, British socialite and politician.
C. Peter Wagner, 86, American theologian and religious leader (New Apostolic Reformation).
Robert Windom, 86, American physician.

22
Martin Aitchison, 96, British illustrator.
Anthony Bryer, 78, British historian. 
José Oscar Barahona Castillo, 77, Salvadoran Roman Catholic prelate, Bishop of San Vicente (1983–2005).
Steve Dillon, 54, English comic book artist (Preacher, The Punisher, Judge Dredd), appendicitis.
Gordon Hamilton, 50, Scottish climate scientist, snowmobile crash.
Gavin MacFadyen, 76, American investigative journalist (CIJ) and filmmaker.
Mehar Mittal, 80, Indian Punjabi actor and producer.
Monarchos, 18, American Thoroughbred racehorse, winner of the 2001 Kentucky Derby.
Antoon Postma, 87, Dutch anthropologist.
Colin Snedeker, 80, British-born American chemist (Crayola), inventor of the washable crayon.
Sheri S. Tepper, 87, American science fiction author.
Frans Tutuhatunewa, 93, Indonesian politician, President in Exile of Republic of South Maluku (1993–2010).
Bob Vanatta, 98, American college basketball coach (Missouri State, Memphis, Missouri).
Valeriya Zaklunna, 74, Ukrainian actress and politician, Member of Verkhovna Rada (1998–2007).

23
Mike Bolan, 83, Canadian politician, member of the Legislative Assembly of Ontario (1977–1981).
Pete Burns, 57, English singer-songwriter (Dead or Alive), cardiac arrest.
Jack Chick, 92, American cartoonist (Chick tracts) and fundamentalist Christian publisher.
Tom Hayden, 76, American writer, politician and activist (Chicago Seven), member of the California State Senate (1992–2000).
Mikijirō Hira, 82, Japanese actor (Rampo, 13 Assassins, Three Outlaw Samurai).
Nerses Hovhannisyan, 78, Armenian film director, actor and screenwriter.
Khalifa bin Hamad Al Thani, 84, Qatari monarch, Emir (1972–1995).
William Löfqvist, 69, Swedish ice hockey player, Olympic bronze medalist (1980).
Harold Mann, 78, Canadian boxer, Commonwealth Games gold medalist (1962).
Jimmy Perry, 93, English actor and screenwriter (Dad's Army, It Ain't Half Hot Mum, Hi-de-Hi!).
Heinz Poenn, 82, Canadian Olympic slalom canoeist (1972).
Bob Saunders, 87, American politician, member of the Florida Senate (1969–1971, 1973–1976).
Jerzy Szymczyk, 74, Polish Olympic volleyball player.
Haguroiwa Tomomi, 70, Japanese sumo wrestler, kidney failure.
Wim van der Voort, 93, Dutch speed skater, Olympic silver medalist (1952).

24
Jorge Batlle, 88, Uruguayan politician, President (2000–2005), cerebral hemorrhage.
Gwanda Chakuamba, 82, Malawian politician.
Eddy Christiani, 98, Dutch musician and songwriter.
Benjamin Creme, 93, Scottish artist, author and esotericist.
Roland Dobbs, 91, British physicist.
Bill Duckworth, 98, Australian footballer.
Herón Escobar, 62, Mexican politician, member of Congress (2009–2012).
Bruce Goodluck, 83, Australian politician.
Reinhard Häfner, 64, German footballer (Dynamo Dresden), Olympic champion (1976).
Bohdan Hawrylyshyn, 90, Ukrainian-born Canadian economist.
Siv Holma, 64, Swedish politician, MP for Norrbotten (1998–2014), cancer.
W. Dudley Johnson, 86, American surgeon.
Hellmut von Leipzig, 95, German soldier.
Eric Loiselet, 56, French politician.
Harry Merlo, 91, American business and sports executive.
Vic Rapp, 86, American-Canadian football coach (BC Lions).
Eugeniusz Rudnik, 83, Polish composer and sound engineer.
Rolf Heinrich Sabersky, 96, German-born American mechanical engineer.
Jack Sellers, 72, American race car driver.
Johan Stølan, 77, Norwegian politician.
Felix Ungacta, 78, Guamanian politician, Mayor of Hagåtña (1981–2005).
Pierre Vallon, 89, French politician.
Bobby Vee, 73, American pop singer ("Rubber Ball", "Take Good Care of My Baby", "The Night Has a Thousand Eyes") and actor, Alzheimer's disease.
Charles Wolf Jr., 92, American economist, cardiac arrest.
John P. Woodall, 81, British entomologist.

25
Margaret Ashcroft, 85, British television actress (The Main Chance, The Brothers).
Margit Bara, 88, Hungarian actress (Jacob the Liar).
Kevin Curran, 59, American television writer (The Simpsons, Married... with Children, Late Night with David Letterman), cancer.
Howard Davies, 71, British theatre and television director.
Mel Haber, 80, American philanthropist, and hotel and restaurant proprietor.
Safa Haeri, 79, Iranian-born French journalist.
Mohamed Nadir Hamimid, 75, Algerian politician.
Bob Hoover, 94, American Air Force test pilot.
Bjørn Lidin Hansen, 27, Norwegian footballer (Tromsø, Lyn), suicide.
Burnet R. Maybank Jr., 92, American lawyer and politician, Lieutenant Governor of South Carolina (1959–1963).
Krešo Omerzel, 59, Slovenian speedway rider and coach.
Edouard Pliner, 80, Russian figure skating coach.
Doug Pyzer, 93, Canadian football player (Toronto Argonauts).
Thomas Rentschler, 84, American politician.
Vaino Spencer, 96, American judge.
Jerzy Szacki, 87, Polish sociologist.
Georges Thines, 93, Belgian scientist.
Carlos Alberto Torres, 72, Brazilian football player and manager, world champion (1970), heart attack.

26
Melis Abzalov, 77, Uzbek filmmaker (Oʻtgan kunlar).
Raj Begum, 89, Indian singer.
Melpomeni Çobani, 88, Albanian actress.
Filomeno Codiñera, 77, Filipino baseball and softball player.
Tim Couzens, 72, South African historian.
Kent Frizzell, 87, American attorney and politician.
Arne Hartman, 76, Finnish diplomat.
Mark Johnson, 65, American baseball umpire.
Gérard Lamy, 97, Canadian politician.
Birger Larsen, 54, Danish film director (Dance of the Polar Bears).
William Eteki Mboumoua, 83, Cameroonian politician and diplomat.
Donald C. Pogue, 69, American federal judge, U.S. Court of International Trade (1995–2014).
Taqi Tabatabaei Qomi, 93, Iranian grand ayatollah.
Luciano Rispoli, 84, Italian television and radio writer and presenter.
Samuele Schiavina, 45, Italian racing cyclist.
Ali Hussein Shihab, 55, Iraqi footballer (national team).
Yuichi Takai, 84, Japanese writer, heart failure.

27
João Lobo Antunes, 72, Portuguese neurosurgeon, melanoma.
Victor Cannings, 97, English cricketer (Hampshire).
René Chamussy, 80, French-Lebanese priest and rector.
Jim Eddy, 80, American football coach (Saskatchewan Roughriders, Houston Oilers, Dallas Cowboys).
Elda Grin, 88, Armenian writer and psychologist.
Brian Hill, 75, English footballer (Coventry City).
Ruben Hovsepyan, 77, Armenian author and politician.
Jolanda Insana, 79, Italian poet and translator, Viareggio Prize recipient.
Fatim Jawara, 19, Gambian footballer (national team), drowned.
Susan Lindquist, 67, American biologist, cancer.
Frank Marchlewski, 73, American football player.
Bill Miller, 86, American javelin thrower, Olympic silver medalist (1952).
Nelson Pinedo, 88, Colombian singer (Sonora Matancera), stroke.
Hazel Shermet, 96, American comedienne, actress (Duffy's Tavern, New Zoo Revue, Jem) and singer.
Pentti Siimes, 87, Finnish actor (The Unknown Soldier).
Takahito, Prince Mikasa, 100, Japanese royal, heart failure.
Francis Tong Hui, 83, Chinese clandestine Roman Catholic prelate, Bishop of Yan’an (1999–2011).
David Tyack, 85, American historian, Parkinson's disease.
Bobby Wellins, 80, Scottish jazz saxophonist.
John Zacherle, 98, American television and radio personality and voice actor.
Vladimir Zemlyanikin, 83, Russian film and theater actor (The House I Live In).

28
Gillon Aitken, 78, English literary agent.
Melhem Barakat, 71, Lebanese singer.
Sir Nicholas Brathwaite, 91, Grenadian politician, Prime Minister (1990–1995), Chairman of the Interim Advisory Council (1983–1984).
H. Kay Hedge, 88, American politician, member of the Iowa Senate (1989-2001).
Shashikala Kakodkar, 81, Indian politician.
Angeline Kopka, 100, American politician, member of the New Hampshire House of Representatives (2002–2010, 2012–2014).
Bumphen Luttimol, 86, Thai footballer

29
Robert Belfanti, 68, American politician, member of the Pennsylvania House of Representatives (1979–2010).
Norman Brokaw, 89, American talent agent (Marilyn Monroe, Clint Eastwood, Andy Griffith).
Nguyễn Văn Chính, 92, Vietnamese politician.
Paul Demers, 60, Canadian singer-songwriter, mesothelioma. 
Roland Dyens, 61, French classical guitarist and composer.
Tony Gauci, 75, Maltese businessman, witness in the Lockerbie bombing case.
 Christiane Gilles, 86, French trade unionist
Raymond Gilmour, 56 or 57, Northern Irish undercover agent, infiltrated INLA and PIRA. (death announced on this date)
E. Lee Hennessee, 64, American hedge fund manager.
John Hicks, 65, American football player (New York Giants), diabetes.
Francis Huxley, 93, British anthropologist.
Stefan Jentsch, 61, German biologist.
Dave Lanning, 78, English sports commentator.
Paul Luebke, 70, American politician, member of the North Carolina House of Representatives (since 1991), lymphoma.
Thorvald Mellingen, 81, Norwegian engineer.
Fernando Moresi, 46, Argentine Olympic field hockey player (1996), Pan American champion (1995).
Kalle Reichelt, 82, Norwegian physician.
John D. Roberts, 98, American chemist.
Geraldo Scarpone Caporale, 88, American-born Honduran Roman Catholic prelate, Bishop of Comayagua (1979–2004).
Pen Sovan, 80, Cambodian politician, Prime Minister (1981).
Barry Stout, 79, American politician, member of the Pennsylvania House of Representatives (1971–1976) and Senate (1977–2010).
Tom Weal, 87, New Zealand politician.

30
Törner Åhsman, 85, Swedish Olympic boxer (1956). 
Pablo Ansaldo, 81, Ecuadorian footballer.
Reg Boorman, 80, New Zealand politician, MP for Wairarapa (1984–1988).
Jack Braughton, 95, British Olympic long-distance runner (1948).
Fausto Cayambe, 40, Ecuadorian politician.
James Galanos, 92, American fashion designer.
Tammy Grimes, 82, American actress (The Unsinkable Molly Brown, High Spirits, Look After Lulu!).
Barney Hartman, 99, Canadian skeet shooter.
Imre Józsa, 62, Hungarian actor.
Betty Ann Kennedy, 86, American bridge player.
Gil Krueger, 87, American football coach (Northern Michigan).
Don Marshall, 80, American actor (Land of the Giants, Star Trek).
David Nash, 77, Welsh rugby union player.
Otaru Salihu Ohize, 63, Nigerian politician.
Curly Putman, 85, American songwriter ("Green, Green Grass of Home", "D-I-V-O-R-C-E", "He Stopped Loving Her Today").
Simon Relph, 76, British film producer and assistant director (Reds, The Ploughman's Lunch), pneumonia.
René Velázquez Valenzuela, Mexican suspected hitman, leader of the Sinaloa Cartel, shot.

31
Natalie Babbitt, 84, American children's author and illustrator (Tuck Everlasting), lung cancer.
Eric Christiansen, 79, British medieval historian.
Abdul Majid Cockar, 93, Kenyan judge, Chief Justice (1994–1997).
Paul Detienne, 91, Belgian Jesuit priest, scholar and writer of Bengali literature.
Silvio Gazzaniga, 95, Italian sculptor (FIFA World Cup Trophy).
Jimmy Gray, 90, English cricketer (Hampshire).
Andy Hill, 54, American politician, member of the Washington Senate (since 2011), lung cancer.
Huo Xuan, 28, Chinese volleyball player (national team), heart attack.
Gene La Rocque, 98, American rear admiral.
Stanley Leavy, 101, American psychoanalyst.
Ray Mabbutt, 80, English footballer, heart attack.
Reynaldo Miravalles, 93, Cuban actor.
Abdel Kader Morchid, 77–78, Moroccan footballer.
Lionel Morrison, 81, South African-born British journalist and trade unionist.
Number 16, 43, Australian trapdoor spider, longest-lived spider on record, parasitic wasp sting. (death discovered on this date)
Klaus Schulten, 69, German-American physicist.
Patrick Sharkey, 85, Irish Olympic boxer (1956). 
Vladimir Zeldin, 101, Russian theater and film actor (Desyat Negrityat), People's Artist of the USSR.

References

2016-10
 10